The Bell House (also known as Biggs House) is a historic house located at 550 Upper Kingston Road in Prattville, Alabama. It is locally significant as an excellent example of the Queen Anne style of architecture, that reached its zenith in Alabama at the turn of the 20th century and continued locally as late as 1920.

Description and history 
The Queen Anne style -story wood-frame house was completed in 1893. It is designed by Alabama architect Frank Lockwood. It was added to the National Register of Historic Places on July 17, 1997, and on the Alabama Register of Landmarks and Heritage on October 7, 1998.

See also

National Register of Historic Places listings in Autauga County, Alabama
Properties on the Alabama Register of Landmarks and Heritage in Autauga County, Alabama

References

Houses on the National Register of Historic Places in Alabama
Queen Anne architecture in Alabama
Houses completed in 1893
National Register of Historic Places in Autauga County, Alabama
Properties on the Alabama Register of Landmarks and Heritage
Houses in Autauga County, Alabama